Trust Me is the fourth studio album by the English singer Craig David. It was released on 12 November 2007 in the United Kingdom and on 6 May 2008 in the United States. The album entered the UK Albums Chart at number 18, but failed to make any impact on the Billboard 200, although it did manage to peak at number 58 on the Top R&B/Hip-Hop Albums chart.

The album was recorded in Havana, Cuba, with the producer Martin Terefe (KT Tunstall, James Morrison) and the writer, producer and mixer Fraser T Smith (Kano, Beyoncé Knowles, Plan B, Jamelia and James Morrison). The second single, "Hot Stuff", contains a sample of "Let's Dance" by David Bowie. The third single, "6 of 1 Thing", was released in the UK on 18 February 2008. The fourth single, "Officially Yours", was released in the UK on 23 June 2008 and peaked at number 158.

The album was certified Gold by BPI on 7 March 2008 for sales of over 100,000 in the UK.

Background and singles
In 2007, David collaborated with the rapper Kano on "This Is the Girl" for his album London Town. Released as a single on 27 August 2007, "This Is the Girl" entered the UK Singles Chart at number 18.

The first single from Trust Me, "Hot Stuff", was released on 5 November 2007. It was a top ten hit and the album charted at number 18 on the UK Albums Chart. "6 of 1 Thing", the second single taken from Trust Me, charted at number 39 on the UK Singles Chart, becoming his third-lowest charting single to date. "Officially Yours" was released on 23 June 2008 and peaked at number 158 on the UK Singles Chart, becoming his lowest-charting single to date and was the final single from Trust Me.

In July, a new track titled "Are You Up for This" started receiving airplay on various radio stations as part of a promotion with Ice Cream Records, which also had a remix with Witty Boy called "Nutter Butter". On 17 August, David performed at a birthday tribute concert for the songwriter Don Black at the London Palladium. He performed the song "Ben", originally a hit for Michael Jackson.

Critical reception

The album received mixed reviews from music critics. At Metacritic, which assigns a normalised rating out of 100 to reviews from mainstream critics, Trust Me has an average score of 53 based on 9 reviews, indicating "mixed or average reviews".

Track listing

Personnel
Credits adapted from album’s liner notes.

Alexander Aberu - trumpet (tracks 2-4, 9)
David Angell - violin (tracks 4, 5, 10)
Joaquin Betancourt - horns (tracks 2-4, 9)
John Catchings - cello (tracks 4, 5, 10)
Craig David - vocals (all tracks), producer (track 11)
David Davidson - string arrangements and violin (tracks 4, 5, 10)
Emilio "Emilito" Del Monte Jr. - congas (tracks 2-6, 9, 10)
Emilio "Puro" Del Monte Sr. - timbales (tracks 2-5, 9, 10)
Steve Fitzmaurice - mixing (track 11)
Chris Gehringer - mastering (all tracks)
Dyre Gormsen - engineer (tracks 2-6, 9, 10)
Isobell Griffiths - strings contractor (track 11)
Jose Louis "Chewy" Hernandez - saxophone (tracks 2-4, 9)
Iain Hill - additional recording (tracks 2-6, 9, 10)
Nick Ingman - arrangements and strings conductor (track 11)
Ian James - backing vocals (track 6)
Martin Jonsson - drums (tracks 2-6, 9)
Thomas Juth - mixing assistant (tracks 3, 5, 6, 10)
Kano - producer and vocals (track 11)
Chris Laurence - string bass (track 11)
Tony Maserati - mixing (tracks 3-6)
Paulo Mendonca - guitar (track 6)
Perry Montague-Mason - violin (track 11)
Andreas Olsson - programming (tracks 2-5, 9), beats and programming (track 6), beats and guitar (track 10)
Rita Ora - vocals (track 4), backing vocals (track 2)
Amaury Perez - trombone (tracks 2-4, 9)
Kelly Pribble - additional recording (tracks 4, 5, 10)
Glen Scott - Hammond organ, piano, and backing vocals (tracks 2-6, 9), synthesizer (tracks 6, 9)
Baeho "Bobby" Shin - additional recording (tracks 4, 5, 10)
Tommy Sims - electric bass and backing vocals (tracks 2-4, 6, 9), acoustic guitar (track 5)
Fraser T Smith - producer (tracks 1, 2, 7, 8, 11), mixing, keyboards, and drum programming (tracks 1, 2, 7, 8), guitar (track 1)
Kristoffer Sonne - drums (track 10)
George Tandero - mixing assistant (tracks 3, 5, 6, 10)
Martin Terefe - producer (tracks 3-6, 9, 10), additional production (tracks 7, 8), guitar (tracks 2-4, 6, 9, 10), bass and backing vocals (tracks 5, 10)
Ivo Van Der Werff - viola (track 11)
Jose-Raul Varonay - additional recording (tracks 2-6, 9, 10)
Kris Wilkinson - viola (tracks 4, 5, 10)
Jonathan Williams - cello (track 11)
Nina Woodford - backing vocals (track 7)
Warren Zielinski - violin (track 11)

Charts

Certifications

References

2007 albums
Craig David albums
Sire Records albums
Warner Records albums